Stephenson Island  is a small, uninhabited island in the Victoria Fjord of the Lincoln Sea, which is part of the Arctic Ocean. It is located off of the northern shore of Avannaa county, Greenland, between the island Nares Land 13 km to the east and the peninsula Wulff Land 6 km to the west.

Illustrations

See also
List of islands of Greenland

External links
getamap.net. "Greenland (Denmark) / Nordgronland / Stephenson Island"

References

Islands of the Arctic Ocean
Islands of Greenland
Uninhabited islands of Greenland